Untapped: The Scramble for Africa's Oil (Harcourt, 2007) is a book written by John Ghazvinian about the petroleum industry in Africa.  The book was received well by critics, and garnered good reviews from both the Boston Globe and The New York Times.  The book is based extensively on interviews, with representatives of multinational oil companies' views being compared and contrasted with those of politicians within Africa as well as the citizens of affected nations.
Jake Saltzman, the famed critic, gave the book five out of five stars.

References

2007 non-fiction books
Books about petroleum politics
Books about Africa
Energy in Africa